This article shows the rosters of all participating teams at the women's indoor volleyball tournament at the 2022 Mediterranean Games in Oran, Algeria.

Group A

The following is the Croatian roster in the 2022 Mediterranean Games.

Head coach: Ferhat Akbaş

The following is France's roster in the 2022 Mediterranean Games.
Head coach: Émile Rousseaux

The following is the Serbian roster in the 2022 Mediterranean Games.

Head coach: Marijana Boričić

Group B

The following is Egypt's roster in the 2022 Mediterranean Games.

The following is Greece's roster in the 2022 Mediterranean Games.

The following is North Macedonia's roster in the 2022 Mediterranean Games.

The following is Tunisia's roster in the 2022 Mediterranean Games.

Group C

The following is Algeria's roster in the 2022 Mediterranean Games.

The following is Spain's roster in the 2022 Mediterranean Games.

The following is Italy's roster in the 2022 Mediterranean Games.

The following is Turkey's roster in the 2022 Mediterranean Games.

References

External links
 Official website

2022